Fabio Lohei (born 12 April 2005) is a Luxembourgian footballer who plays as a left-back for the French club Metz II and the Luxembourg national team.

Career
A youth product of Differdange and Racing FC, Lohei joined the youth academy of Metz in 2018. He was promoted to Metz reserves for the 2022-23 season.

International career
Lohei is a youth international for Luxembourg, having played up to the Luxembourg U19s. He was called up to the senior Luxembourg national team for a set of matches in June 2022. He debuted with the senior Luxembourg in a friendly 2–2 tie with Hungary on 17 November 2022.

References

External links
 
 

2005 births
Living people
People from Differdange
Luxembourgian footballers
Luxembourg international footballers
FC Metz players
Championnat National 2 players
Association football fullbacks
Luxembourgian expatriate footballers
Luxembourgian expatriate sportspeople in France
Expatriate footballers in France